Denis Adeane Mitchell (30 June 1912 – 23 March 1993) was an English abstract sculptor who worked mainly in bronze and wood. A prominent member of the St Ives group of artists, he worked as an assistant to Barbara Hepworth for many years.

Biographical Timeline 
1912. Born 30 June in Wealdstone, Middlesex.

1913. Moved to Mumbles, near Swansea with mother and brother Endell.

1923. Attends Mumbles Grammar School.

1928. Joins the Little Theatre, Swansea. Met Dylan Thomas.

1930. Went to St Ives with Endell Mitchell to renovate aunt's cottages and set up a market garden at Balnoon, Halsetown. Begins to paint more seriously. Makes regular visits back to Wales.

1932. Continues with market garden with brother Endell. Met St Ives artists.

1935. Summer job in St Ives. Met Jane Stevens. Travels to Gibraltar and Tangier with Endell to paint.

1938. Endell marries and moves to Castle Inn, St Ives. Denis continues gardening and begins painting landscapes.

1939. Denis and Jane Mitchell marry at Towednack Parish Church.

1942-45. War service in Geevor Tin Mine. Met Bernard Leach and Adrian Stokes through the Home Guard.

1946-48. Market gardening, sea fishing and painting landscapes. Member of St Ives Society of Artists.

1947. Exhibits work at Downings bookshop in Fore Street and the Castle Inn.

1949-59. Principal assistant to Barbara Hepworth.

1949. Founder member Penwith Society of Arts in Cornwall. Began to make own sculpture.

1953. Visited exhibition of pre-Columbian and Mexican art at Tate Gallery.

1955-57. Chairman Penwith Society of Arts.

1957-60. Porthia Prints.

1959. Left Barbara Hepworth. First sculptures in bronze.

1960-67. Part-time teaching Redruth School of Art and Penzance Grammar School.

1966. Arts Council award. Bronzes, woodcarvings, slate reliefs.

1967. Left teaching to sculpt full-time.

1967. Moved studio to join John Wells at the Trewarveneth Studio in Newlyn.

1968. Foreign Office commission Zelah No I (bronze), for University of the Andes, Colombia.

1968. Zelah No 2 exhibit of the Month, National Art Gallery of New Zealand.

1969. Moved to La Pietra in Newlyn.

1970. Lecture tour of Colombia including a month teaching at the University of the Andes at Bogota.

1973. Governor Plymouth College of Art and Design.

1973-79. British Council tour of work.

1974. Council of Management, Newlyn Orion. New series of slate carvings.

1977. Governor Falmouth School of Art.

1980-92. Continues working at Trewarveneth Studios with Tommy Rowe.

1993. Dies 23 March

Biography
Denis Mitchell was born in 1912 in Wealdstone, Middlesex. The family moved to South Wales when he was a young child and it was while growing up there that he developed an interest in art. He moved to Cornwall in 1930 and initially earned a living working with his brother to renovate cottages. Drawn to the artistic community at St Ives, it was there that he began to paint seriously and engage with other artists.

He married in 1939 and during the Second World War worked as a miner at Geevor. This experience of hewing rock fuelled an interest in sculpture and at the end of the war, Bernard Leach suggest his name to Barbara Hepworth as a studio assistant. An initial day of work led to a 10 year long collaboration in which he was principal assistant and supervised the creation of many of Hepworth's sculptures. By the early 1950s, he was creating many sculptures himself.

In 1955, Mitchell was elected chairman of the Penwith Society of abstract artists and worked out of his own studio in Fore Street, St Ives. He left Hepworth's service in 1959 and became known in the 1960s for his polished bronzes, achieving international recognition with exhibitions in New York and London.

From 1960 he taught at Redruth School of Art and Penzance Grammar School. In 1967 he gave up teaching to commit to full time sculpture and moved to Newlyn to share the large studio of his friend and fellow artist John Wells.

Representation in Public Collections 
Arts Council of Great Britain.

Bishop Otter College, Chichester.

British Council

Calouste Gulbenkian Foundation.

Churchill College, Cambridge.

Cornwall County Council Education Committee.

Cornwall Education Committee.

Cumberland Education Committee.

Fitzwilliam Museum, Cambridge.

Glynn Vivian Art Gallery and Museum, Swansea

Hepworth Gallery, Wakefield

John Player and Son, Nottingham.

LCC Battersea Training College.

Leeds University, The Stanley and Audrey Burton Gallery

Leicestershire Education Committee.

London Borough of Camden

Manchester University, Manchester.

National Gallery of New South Wales, Sydney, Australia.

National Gallery of Wellington, New Zealand.

National Museum of Wales.

Pallant House Gallery, Chichester

Royal Academy of Music, London.

Royal Albert Museum and Art Gallery, Exeter.

Royal Cornwall Museum, Truro

St Helen's School, Northwood, London.

St Hilda’s College, University of Oxford

Santa Barbara Museum of Art, Santa Barbara, California.

Somerville College, Oxford.

Southwest Arts.

Southampton City Art Gallery

Stanley Picker Trust

Tate Gallery.

University of the Andes, Bogota, Colombia.

Wakefield Education Committee.

Walker Art Gallery, Liverpool.

West Riding Educational Committee.

See also

 List of St Ives artists

References

External links
Information about Mitchell from Cornwall County Council
www.denismitchell.co.uk

1912 births
1993 deaths
St Ives artists
20th-century British sculptors
British male sculptors
20th-century British male artists